Luis Alberto Hernando (born 22 September 1977) is a Spanish male sky runner champion and before, as biathlete, also competed at the 2006 Winter Olympics.

Biography
He has won four gold medals in two different sports, trail running and sky running, two at Trail World Championships (2016, 2017), and two at the Skyrunning World Championships (2014, 2016). In his career, Hernando has achieved international results in five different sports.

Achievements

See also
 List of multi-sport athletes - Skyrunning

References

External links
UTMB Index + Profile of Luis Alberto Hernando
 
 
 

Luis Alberto Hernando profile at Corredores de Montana
Luis Alberto Hernando Palmarès

1977 births
Living people
Spanish male long-distance runners
Spanish male ski mountaineers
Spanish male cross-country skiers
Spanish male biathletes
Spanish male mountain runners
Spanish ultramarathon runners
Spanish sky runners
Biathletes at the 2006 Winter Olympics
Olympic biathletes of Spain
Trail runners
Skyrunning World Championships winners
IAU Trail World Championships winners